Alopecia is a synonym for hair loss. In everyday use the term may refer specifically to:

 Alopecia areata (spot baldness), where hair is lost from some to almost all areas of the body
 Alopecia universalis, where hair is lost from all areas of the body

Other 

 Alopecia (album), a 2008 album by the band Why?

See also